The 1981 Boston University Terriers football team was an American football team that represented Boston University as a member of the Yankee Conference during the 1981 NCAA Division I-AA football season. In their fifth season under head coach Rick Taylor, the Terriers compiled a 6–5 record (3–2 against conference opponents), finished third in the conference, and outscored opponents by a total of 263 to 184.

Schedule

References

Boston University
Boston University Terriers football seasons
Boston University Terriers football